"They Say" is a jazz standard and popular song written in 1938. It has music by Stephan Weiss and Paul Mann and with lyrics by Edward Heyman.

It was one of the highest-selling pieces of sheet music in January 1939. It peaked at #5 on Your Hit Parade.

It is ranked the 987th most recorded standard by JazzStandards.com.

Notable recordings 

 Billie Holiday performed the vocals on the Benny Carter-arranged Teddy Wilson orchestra recording (1938)
 Helen Forrest (1938) performed the vocals on the Artie Shaw orchestra recording
 Mildred Bailey (1938)
Tommy Ryan performed the vocals on the Sammy Kaye orchestra recording (1939)

In film 
"They Say" was used in the films Daughters Courageous (1939) and King of the Lumberjacks (1940).

References   

1938 songs
Songs with lyrics by Edward Heyman